Vaillantella, the long-fin loaches, is a small genus of loaches found in Southeast Asia.  This genus is the only member of the family Vaillantellidae having been confirmed as such by M. Kottelat in his review of the loaches in 2012.

Species
There are currently three recognized species in this genus:
 Vaillantella cinnamomea Kottelat, 1994
 Vaillantella euepiptera (Vaillant, 1902)
 Vaillantella maassi M. C. W. Weber & de Beaufort, 1912

References

Vaillantellidae
Fish of Asia